Muhammad Al Khadziq (born 30 December 1967) is an Indonesian politician and former journalist who is the regent of Temanggung, Central Java. Before being elected as the leader of his home regency, he had been active at various Islamic organizations both during and after his studies.

Early life and education
Al Khadziq was born in Temanggung on 30 December 1967. After completing his elementary and middle school in Temanggung, he went to a pesantren for 2 years before continuing to a state-funded madrasa for his final 3 years of basic education.

After graduating from the madrasa, he was active at various Islamic student organizations, including the Ansor Youth Movement. He studied philosophy at the Sunan Kalijaga State Islamic University.

Career
Following his education, he worked as an editor at Yogya Pos (1995-1998) and later Jawa Pos (1998-2002). He became the chief editor for Nahdlatul Ulama paper Duta Masyarakat between 2002 and 2004. After journalism, he became a consultant, working for the Ministry of Disadvantaged Regions between 2004 and 2006. Afterwards, he became a public relations consultant, in addition to heading the editorial board of the magazine Event Guide. He was also part of the central committee of the Ansor Youth Movement.

Politically, he had joined the Democratic Party, United Development Party and the National Awakening Party before his marriage, after which he joined Golkar. He ran in Temanggung's 2018 regency election with Heri Ibnu Wibowo as his running mate and parties Gerindra, PPP, Golkar, and PAN supporting him, with the pair ending up winning 54.3 percent of the votes (258,734) in a three-candidate race against the incumbent regent and vice-regent (who ran separately).

He was sworn in by governor Ganjar Pranowo on 24 September 2018.

Family
His wife Eni Maulani Saragih is a member of the People's Representative Council. In 2018, she was arrested by the Corruption Eradication Commission and Khadziq was examined as a witness. The couple has two children.

References

1967 births
Living people
Golkar politicians
Mayors and regents of places in Central Java
People from Temanggung Regency
Regents of places in Indonesia